Kai Tak East  is one of the 25 constituencies in the Kowloon City District.

Created for the 2019 District Council elections, the constituency returns one district councillor to the Kowloon City District Council, with an election every four years.

Kai Tak East loosely covers part of the public housing estate Tak Long Estate in the previously Kai Tak Airport. It has projected population of 12,993.

Councillors represented

Election results

2010s

References

Kai Tak Development
Constituencies of Hong Kong
Constituencies of Kowloon City District Council
2019 establishments in Hong Kong
Constituencies established in 2019